Federico Vicente Fong Pharris (born 1967 in San Rafael, California) simply known as Federico Fong is a musician and producer, member of several bands in Mexico and the United States; these include Hip Hop Hoodíos, Jaguares, La Barranca, Caifanes, and Fobia.

Biography
Born in Northern California's Bay Area in 1967 to a Panamanian father of Chinese descent and an American mother, Fong relocated at a young age with his family to Mexico City where he has lived for the majority of his life.

He was a resident of Brooklyn, New York for a few years and then relocated to Mexico City to continue working mainly with band La Barranca.

References

1967 births
Living people
Mexican bass guitarists
American male bass guitarists
Musicians from Mexico City
American emigrants to Mexico
Mexican people of Panamanian descent
Mexican people of Chinese descent
20th-century American bass guitarists
20th-century American male musicians
Mexican male guitarists